Georges Tandel (24 July 1910 – 17 December 1981) was a Luxembourgian swimmer. He competed in the men's 4 × 200 metre freestyle relay at the 1936 Summer Olympics.

References

1910 births
1981 deaths
Luxembourgian male freestyle swimmers
Olympic swimmers of Luxembourg
Swimmers at the 1936 Summer Olympics
Sportspeople from Luxembourg City